The Chennai Egmore–Kollam Junction Express (16101/16102, earlier known as the Quilon Mail) is a daily train that runs between Chennai Egmore and  in India. It is the successor of 115 years old Quilon Mail, which ran once upon a time in metre-gauge lines between Madras and Quilon.

History 
Opened on 1 June 1904, the Quilon–Madras rail line was the first line in Travancore. Its official gauge conversion started in 1998 and completed in 2018. On 31 March 2018, the entire Kollam–Sengottai line was opened for passenger train service. The first passenger train was the Tambaram–Kollam–Tambaram special train (06027) that earned Rs 3.15 lakh by carrying 879 passengers against a capacity of 712. The line provides a shorter route to Thiruvananthapuram via Kollam. Other routes include: Coimbatore and Pollachi to Palakkad, from Madurai via Kanyakumari.

On 4 March 2019, railway started daily service between Kollam Junction and Chennai Egmore by extending Tambaram–Kollam tri-weekly special train to Chennai Egmore and increased the frequency as a daily service. The service was speeded-up by 35 minutes and the number of intermediate stops were reduced to 21 from 25 (Tiruttangal, Pamba Kovil Shandy, Bhagavathipuram, Auvaneeswaram). The service was first flagged off by Travancore Maharajah Mulam Thirunal Rama Varma in 1904 as Quilon–Madras Mail. The service was diverted through Virudhunagar and Manamadurai in 1996 due to gauge conversion works in Virudhunagar–Madurai stretch. Later, the service discontinued in 2000 for gauge conversion works.

Route 
It runs along the British-made historic Quilon–Madras rail route and other chord lines including Kollam–Sengottai which is the shortest existing rail route from Chennai to Kollam via Chengalpattu, Dindigul, Trichy, Madurai, Srivilliputtur, Tenkasi and Punalur.

Chennai Egmore→ → → → →Tiruchchirappalli Junction → → → → → →Sankarankovil →Kadayanallur → → → → → → →Kollam Junction

Traction
As the route is partly electrified, an Arakkonam-based WAP-4 or Royapuram-based WAP-7 hauls the train till Virudunagar Junction handing over to a GOC-based diesel WDG-3A which powers the train for the remainder of the journey.

Coach composition 
The train has 14 bogies comprising one A/C two-tier, one A/C three-tier, eight sleeper class, two unreserved general coaches and 2 luggage rakes.

Schedule

See also 
 Anantapuri Express
 Palaruvi Express
 Silambu Express
 Pothigai Express

Notes

References

Sources 
https://indiarailinfo.com/train/96239
https://indiarailinfo.com/train/96242

External links 
 Southern India Railways - Official Website
 Southern India Railway

Express trains in India
Rail transport in Kollam
Rail transport in Kerala
Rail transport in Tamil Nadu
Railway services introduced in 2019